Sakhla Sylla (born 22 November 1989) is a Senegalese footballer who plays as a midfielder. She has been a member of the Senegal women's national team.

Club career
Sylla has played for Etoile du Sine, Sirènes Grand Yoff and US Parcelles Assainies Dakar in Senegal.

International career
Sylla capped for Senegal at senior level during the 2014 Africa Women Cup of Nations qualification.

References

External links

1989 births
Living people
People from Fatick Region
Senegalese women's footballers
Women's association football forwards
Senegal women's international footballers